Corbin Bleu Reivers (born February 21, 1989), known professionally as Corbin Bleu, is an American actor and singer. He made his acting debut in the 2004 adventure comedy film Catch That Kid. He has since appeared in the Discovery Kids drama series Flight 29 Down (2005–2007). He began acting professionally in the early 2000s and rose to prominence in the late 2000s for his leading role as Chad Danforth in the High School Musical trilogy (2006–2008). Songs from the films also charted worldwide, with the song "I Don't Dance" peaking inside the Top 70 of the Billboard Hot 100. During this time, he also starred in the Disney Channel Original Movie Jump In! (2007), as well as the film To Write Love on Her Arms (2015). He competed in the 17th season of Dancing with the Stars.

Bleu has also pursued a music career and his debut album Another Side was released in 2007, which included the hit "Push It to the Limit". The album debuted and peaked at number thirty-six on the U.S. Billboard 200 album chart, selling 18,000 copies in its first week. His second album, Speed of Light, was released in 2009. He returned to television, starring in the short-lived Ashton Kutcher–produced CW series, The Beautiful Life: TBL (2009), and the movie Free Style (2009). He has appeared in the films The Little Engine That Could (2011), Scary or Die (2012), Nurse 3D (2013), Sugar (2013), The Monkey's Paw (2013), and Walk. Ride. Rodeo. (2019).

In 2010, Bleu played Usnavi in the Broadway company of In the Heights. In 2012, he returned to Broadway in the revival of Godspell. In 2013, he was cast as Jeffrey King in the short-lived online revival of the daytime soap One Life to Live. In 2016, Bleu played Ted Hanover in the Broadway company of Holiday Inn, the New Irving Berlin Musical. He subsequently signed a recording contract with Ghostlight Records, to distribute his Holiday Inn soundtrack music, released in 2017. In 2019, he returned to play Bill Calhoun/Lucentio in the Broadway company of Kiss Me, Kate. He subsequently signed a recording contract with Ghostlight Records, to distribute his Kiss Me, Kate soundtrack music, released on June 7, 2019.

Early life and education
Bleu was born in New York City, in the borough of Brooklyn, the son of Martha (née Callari) and David Reivers (born 1958), an actor. His mother is Italian American and his father is Jamaican American. He has three younger sisters: Jag, Phoenix, and Hunter. As a child, Bleu studied dance for several years, focusing on ballet and jazz. His great-uncle is actor Joseph Callari.

Bleu appeared in television commercials starting at the age of two, for products such as: Life cereal, Bounty, Hasbro and Nabisco. He began taking jazz and ballet classes, usually being the only boy in the class. By the age of four he was a model with the Ford Modeling Agency in New York. He appeared in print ads for stores such as: Macy's, Gap, Target and Toys R Us and appeared in fashion spreads in Child, Parents, and American Baby magazines, as well as having his image on toys and game packaging.

At age six, Corbin appeared in his first professional theater production off Broadway, at The Town Hall. This three-concert series, created, written, and hosted by Scott Siegel, took place over one weekend and included a tribute to David Merrick. Corbin Bleu played an abandoned homeless mute in the play Tiny Tim is Dead.

Bleu graduated from Los Angeles County High School for the Arts. He trained in dancing at the Debbie Allen Dance Academy and attended the Fiorello H. LaGuardia High School of Music & Art and Performing Arts in New York as a theater major, following in his mother's footsteps. Bleu graduated from high school in 2007 and was admitted to Stanford University, but declined to matriculate.

Acting career

1996–2005: Early career
Bleu moved with his family from New York to Los Angeles in 1996. He worked steadily in episodic television and feature film roles, including a recurring role on the short-lived ABC police drama High Incident and a guest star appearance on ER. He also appeared in some films, like Beach Movie (1998) and the sci-fi thriller Soldier (1998). His feature films from this period include the Tim Allen comedy Galaxy Quest (1999) and the comedy Mystery Men (1999), which starred Ben Stiller and the drama Family Tree (1999), alongside Andrew Lawrence and Matthew Lawrence. Bleu also had roles in Malcolm & Eddie, as Matthew, and Cover Me: Based on the True Life of an FBI Family (2000), as Nick Elderby and smaller roles like in the comedy series Nickelodeon's show The Amanda Show.

Additionally, Bleu was developing his dance skills and in 2001 began intensive training at the Debbie Allen Dance Academy in the Los Angeles area. There he undertook a full gamut of dance instruction, including: ballet, jazz, tap, modern, hip-hop, African, break dance, salsa, flamenco and ballroom. Allen, the famous choreographer who starred in the TV series Fame, told Dance Spirit magazine:"I think [Bleu] really has a career. Success is one thing, but a career is a much longer, broader journey".

Bleu attended the Los Angeles County High School for the Arts, a magnet school like the Fiorello H. LaGuardia High School of Music & Art and Performing Arts, which was portrayed in the movie and television series Fame and which Bleu's mother had attended. During his freshman year, he won his first sizable film role in the teen action caper Catch That Kid (2004), about a girl and her friends who decide to rob a bank after learning that money is needed to aid her dying father, alongside Kristen Stewart and Max Thieriot. Although it was a box office flop, having only grossed $10 million, it served as an important step for Bleu, who was still building his acting career at the time. During high school, he performed in such student productions as Footloose and Grease, winning the honor of Theatre Student of the Year.

In the summer of 2004 Bleu landed a starring role in the television series Flight 29 Down, alongside Allen Alvarado, Hallee Hirsh, Lauren Storm, Jeremy James Kissner, Johnny Pacar and Kristy Wu, which aired for three seasons on the Discovery Kids network. The program, a juvenile version of the ABC series Lost, concerned a group of teenagers stranded on a tropical island after their plane crashes. Bleu played as Nathan McHugh, a Boy Scout whose leadership skills do not quite measure up to his self-confidence.

2006–2008: High School Musical and breakthrough

Bleu's next television project was the Disney Channel original film High School Musical (2006) in which he portrayed the basketball player Chad Danforth, who tries to persuade his teammate Troy Bolton (Zac Efron) to give up his interest in theater and focus on winning the basketball championship. High School Musical premiered on January 20, 2006; with an audience of 7.7 million television viewers, it was the Disney Channel's most successful TV movie up to that point. The film, which also starred Ashley Tisdale, Lucas Grabeel, Vanessa Hudgens, and Monique Coleman in pivotal roles, became a major success and helped Bleu gain recognition among teenage audiences. The film's soundtrack was certified quadruple platinum by the Recording Industry Association of America (RIAA).

He joined co-stars on the 51-date High School Musical: The Concert (2006–2007) tour to promote the film, work on the second film in the High School Musical series began, and Bleu was confirmed to be returning for the sequel. High School Musical 2 (2007) was released on August 17, 2007. The premiere was seen by a total of over 17.2 million viewers in the U.S., which is almost 10 million more than its predecessor, making it the highest-rated Disney Channel Movie of all time. Disney Channel aired a weekly program called Road to High School Musical 2, beginning on June 8, 2007, and leading up to the premiere of High School Musical 2 in August. The show offered viewers a behind-the-scenes look into the production of the movie. The world premiere of the opening number "What Time Is It" was on Radio Disney May 25, 2007, and similarly the song "I Don't Dance" premiered on August 14, 2007. The film was generally well received by critics, gaining a score of 77/100 at Metacritic and 82% on Rotten Tomatoes. The film broke opening weekend records and grossed over $250 million worldwide. The soundtrack for the film, featuring numerous contributions from Bleu, went on to sell over three million copies in the United States alone. The song "I Don't Dance" (2007), a duet with Lucas Grabeel, became his first top forty hit on the Billboard Hot 100, and was certified gold by the Recording Industry Association of America (RIAA). It was named as the official theme song for the 2007 Little League World Series. During this time, Bleu began song on soundtracks for the Disney Channel, and released a cover of "Two Worlds" (2007) to promote Tarzan.

In 2007, Bleu starred in his next film, another Disney Channel original entitled Jump In! (2007), which aired on January 12, 2007. Directed by Paul Hoen, the television movie revolved around a young boy named Izzy Daniels who trains regularly in order to try to follow in his father's footsteps and win the Golden Glove, an amateur boxing tournament. While Bleu played the lead role of Daniels, Keke Palmer portrayed the role of Mary, his friend who has a crush on Daniels. Again, Disney scored a crossover hit with the Jump In! soundtrack album, was released in January 2007, on which Bleu sings the track, "Push It to the Limit" (2006). Reaching the screens on the Disney Channel that January, Jump In! was a major hit amongst young viewers and quickly became the highest-rated premiere the network has ever since, breaking the previous record set by The Cheetah Girls 2 in 2006. Similar to High School Musical, its soundtrack was also a commercial hit, having achieved gold status from the Recording Industry Association of America (RIAA) three months after its release. He appeared in a music video of a new Atlanta group Small Change's video, "Don't Be Shy" featuring Chani and Lil' JJ.

He guest starred as Johnny Collins in the premiere two episodes of Disney's Hannah Montana (2006–2008). He also had a small role as Spencer on Ned's Declassified School Survival Guide, appearing in the episodes entitled Guide to: The School Play and Guide to: Revenge & School Records. and Mother Goose Parade as Grand Marshal in 2006 and 2007. While with Disney Channel, Bleu also participated in the first ever Disney Channel Games and co-captained the blue team along with Jake T. Austin, Maiara Walsh, Cole Sprouse and Kiely Williams. A year before, he returned to repeat his captaincy of the blue team with Brenda Song, Vanessa Hudgens, Monique Coleman and Jason Earles. In August 2007, Bleu starred in Flight 29 Down: The Hotel Tango, an teen drama film version of the television series of the same name. Also in 2007, he is voice in The Secret of the Magic Gourd (2007), He appeared on The Tyra Banks Show in 2008.

Bleu went on to reprise his role of Chad Danforth in High School Musical 3: Senior Year (2008), the first film in the High School Musical franchise to receive a theatrical release. It opened at number one at the North American box office in October 2008, earning $42 million in its first weekend, which broke the record previously held by Mamma Mia! for the biggest opening by a musical. The film finished with $252 million worldwide, which exceeded Disney's expectations. The song "The Boys Are Back" (2008), a duet with Zac Efron, became his second top forty hit on the Billboard Hot 100, and was certified gold by the Recording Industry Association of America (RIAA) and Australian Recording Industry Association (ARIA). The phenomenon of High School Musical has changed Bleu's life, delivering him to the heights of media celebrity while still in his teens. For his role as Chad Danforth, the team captain of the school's basketball team, he was nominated for an NAACP Image Award and a Young Artist Award and Teen Choice Awards in 2007 and 2009 respectively. Bleu lent his voice for the role of Chad Danforth in High School Musical video games, a video game.

2009–present: Continued work
The following year, Bleu played the lead role in the film called Free Style (2009). It concerns Cale Bryant, an eighteen-year-old man who tries to find himself by winning the Amateur National Motocross Championships. Free Style performed poorly in the box office, having only grossed $720,000 from a $10 million budget. Over the next few years, Bleu's television roles included the drama series The CW Television Network's show The Beautiful Life: TBL. The series was subsequently cancelled on September 25, 2009 after televising 2 episodes. In December 2009, the technology company HP became the show's sponsor and began airing the show's five episodes on YouTube. Also in 2009, he was a voice actor in Beyond All Boundaries, and appeared on Entertainment Tonight and The Morning Show with Mike and Juliet. Also in 2009, he was the voice of Coltrane in the premiere two episodes of Disney's Phineas and Ferb.

Corbin Bleu made his Broadway stage debut in 2010 as the lead character, bodega-owner Usnavi, in the critically acclaimed musical In the Heights. and guest starred in one episode of The Good Wife as DJ Javier Berlin in October 2010. in 2010, Corbin starred in the short comedy film I Owe My Life to Corbin Bleu, alongside Andrew Caldwell, Drake Bell, Sarah Hyland, Ryan Pinkston, Sterling Knight, Matt Prokop, Matt Shively and Josh Sussman. In 2011, he performed the voice Lou in The Little Engine That Could (2011). From August 5–7, Bleu performed in the musical Hairspray as Seaweed at the Hollywood Bowl, alongside Nick Jonas, Harvey Fierstein, Marissa Jaret Winokur, Drew Carey and Darlene Love. and he performed the voice Flip in Tonka Chuck and Friends: Big Air Dare.

In 2012, Bleu also had a role in and co-produced the indie horror anthology Scary or Die (2012), a collection of five short horror films. In 2012, he joined the cast of Godspell as Jesus beginning April 17 at the Circle in the Square Theatre. He joined co-stars on the 66th Annual Tony Awards, to performing "Day by Day" and "Light of the World" at Beacon Theatre, with Neil Patrick Harris as the host. During this time, he recorded the duet "If I Never Knew You" (2012), with Anna Maria Perez de Tagle to promote Pocahontas. He guest starred in one episode of Blue Bloods as Officer Blake in 2012. In 2012, he performed the voice Drew in Twinkle Toes, Bleu starred in the drama film To Write Love on Her Arms (originally titled Renee) in 2012, with Kat Dennings, Chad Michael Murray and Rupert Friend. The film began production in Orlando, Florida, in February 2011.

In March 2013, Bleu had a role in the horror film The Monkey's Paw (2013). and guest starred in one episode of Franklin & Bash as Jordan Allen French in 2013. In April 2013, Bleu was cast in the role of Jeffrey King on the ABC daytime soap opera One Life to Live. In 2013, Bleu starred in the film Sugar (2013), alongside Shenae Grimes and Marshall Allman. about a runaway girl living on the streets of Venice, Los Angeles. The film began production in Venice, Los Angeles, on November 30, 2010. Also in 2013, Bleu appeared in the horror films Nurse 3D (2013), alongside Paz de la Huerta and Katrina Bowden. The film began production in Toronto, on September 6, 2011 and wrapped on October 21, 2011. In 2014 he also appeared as a guest star in Psych, the USA Network television series in Season 8.

In September 2013, Bleu took part in the seventeenth-season of ABC's dancing competition Dancing with the Stars. He finished as runner-up. 

Bleu's only release in 2015 was the moderately successful Megachurch Murder (2015), in which he played a Marcus King, with Tamala Jones, Shanica Knowles and Romeo Miller. In addition, Bleu appeared in Family Shots with The Human Race Theatre Company. In 2016, he also made a guest appearance in an episode of the family drama, The Fosters, playing the role of Mercutio, a character who appears in a school musical production of Romeo and Juliet. Bleu and fellow guest-star Ashley Argota also co-starred in a production of Romeo and Juliet: Love Is a Battlefield at Rockwell Table and Stage, produced by The Fosters co-creator Bradley Bredeweg. He also had a small role as Spencer on Castle in 2016. 

In January 2016, he joined the cast of The Dodgers as Simon, the rational voice amid the habitually stoned chatter, and beginning January 21 at the Hudson Mainstage Theatre. In October 2016, he took part in Broadway productions notably the leading role in Holiday Inn, The New Irving Berlin Musical (originally titled Holiday Inn), a musical based on the 1942 Academy Award-winning film of the same name. Returning to his tap dancing roots was "like riding a bike". His former Disney co-stars attended a performance in October 2016. The Broadway alum and High School Musical favorite grabbed a camera as Broadway websites' newest vlogger, resulting in Bleu Skies: Backstage at Holiday Inn with Corbin Bleu. Bleu, who played Ted in the new Irving Berlin musical, gave a glimpse of backstage life at Studio 54, where he and his co-stars (including former vlogger Bryce Pinkham, Lora Lee Gayer, Megan Lawrence and Megan Sikora) celebrated an entire year's worth of special occasions eight times a week. Bleu Skies launched off on August 23 and ran every Tuesday for eight weeks. with Bleu being nominated for a Chita Rivera Awards for Dance and Choreography in 2017, for outstanding dancing in a Broadway show and eventually winning a Chita Rivera Award for his performance.

While with ABC television, Bleu also participated in the revival of Battle of the Network Stars, joining the red team along with Joey Lawrence, Nolan Gould, Lisa Whelchel and Kim Fields, with Ronda Rousey as the captain. The series premiered on June 29, 2017. From July 28–30, Bleu performed in the musical Mamma Mia! as Sky at the Hollywood Bowl, alongside Dove Cameron, Lea DeLaria and Jennifer Nettles. The theatre premiered on July 28, 2017. Corbin Bleu's career also included voice over work with Breathe Bible. In December 2017, Corbin Bleu hosted the 2017 Looking Ahead Awards, presented by The Actors Fund.

In November 2017, Bleu returned to 25th season of the show and in Week 8, he performed in a trio Salsa with Jordan Fisher and his professional partner Lindsay Arnold. After the trio delivered their Salsa to audiences, they ended with a score of 30 from the judges,

In January 2018, he guest starred in one episode of The Middle as Luke, a handsome drummer that catches Brad's attention. In 2018 he also appeared as a guest star in Chicago Med, the NBC television series in Season 3, as Tommy Oliver. From June 27 – July 3, Bleu performed in the musical Singin' in the Rain as Don Lockwood at the St. Louis Municipal Opera Theatre, a musical based on the 1952 BAFTA Film Awards-winning film of the same name. The theatre premiered on June 27, 2018. with Bleu being nominated for a St. Louis Theater Circle Awards in 2019, for Outstanding Actor in a Musical. Near the end of 2018, Bleu played Billy Crocker in Anything Goes, which will be seen in-the-round at Arena Stage in D.C. Washington from November 2, 2018 to December 23, 2018. with Bleu being nominated for a Helen Hayes Award in 2019, for Outstanding Actor in a Musical and eventually winning a Helen Hayes Award for Outstanding Lead Actor in a Musical.

In March 2019, he was cast in the Netflix drama film Walk. Ride. Rodeo. (2019), alongside Missi Pyle, Spencer Locke and Bailey Chase, directed by Conor Allyn. He appeared on Show Offs in 2019. In 2019, Bleu played Bill Calhoun/Lucentio in the Broadway revival of Kiss Me, Kate at the Roundabout Theatre's Studio 54. The musical originally opened on Broadway in 1948 and five years later was the basis for a liberally adapted 1953 film of the same name. The production, directed by Scott Ellis, began previewing on February 14, 2019. The limited engagement is scheduled to continue through June 30 at Studio 54. For his performance, Bleu was nominated for the Drama Desk Award for Outstanding Featured Actor in a Musical. Bleu was also nominated for a 2019 Chita Rivera Awards for Dance and Choreography, for Outstanding Male Dancer in a Broadway Show and for an Audience Choice Awards for Favorite Featured Actor in a Musical. He was cast in a co-starring role in the Jordan Barker film Witches in the Woods (2019), The project also stars Hannah Kasulka and Sasha Clements. Bleu filmed an independent movie titled Ovid and the Art of Love. Filmed partially at the old St. Agnus Church in Michigan, the project also stars John Savage, Tamara Feldman and Tara Summers.

In 2020, he appeared on The Disney Family Singalong, which aired on ABC on April 16, 2020, during the COVID-19 pandemic in the United States. In May 2020, he also appeared as a guest star in Supergirl, the CBS television series in Season 5, as Trevor Crane. On June 30, 2020, Bleu joined in a live reading adaptation of Jason Reitman's Up in the Air to help raise funds for Acting for a Cause. The event's purpose was to help industry personnel impacted by COVID-19. Bleu was later announced as the host of the 2021 Jimmy Awards, in honor of legendary Broadway producer and theater owner James M. Nederlander.

In 2021, he guest starred as Blaine in the premiere two episodes on The CW Television Network soap opera Dynasty. In July 2021, he was cast in the Hallmark Channel original entitled Love, for Real (2021), alongside Chloe Bridges, Camille Kostek and Scott Michael Foster, directed by Maclain Nelson. In December 2021, he appeared as the male lead in the a Lifetime Christmas movie, titled A Christmas Dance Reunion (2021), alongside Monique Coleman, directed by Brian Herzlinger. During this time, Bleu began song on soundtracks for the Winnie the Pooh: The New Musical Adaptation, and released a cover of "Winnie the Pooh" (2021).

In July 2022, he was cast in the Hallmark Channel original entitled Campfire Christmas (2022), alongside Tori Anderson and Jeffrey Bowyer-Chapman, directed by David I. Strasser. He is set to return to the High School Musical franchise, guest starring as himself in the third season of High School Musical: The Musical: The Series, Bleu contributes to two numbers a duet with star Sofia Wylie on the original song "Different Way to Dance" and with the entire cast on "Everyday". From July 5-13, Bleu performed in the musical Mary Poppins as Bert at the St. Louis Municipal Opera Theatre, directed by John Tartaglia, choreographed by Patrick O'Neill, with music direction by Brad Haak.

Music career
Bleu's first professionally recorded song was titled "Circles" or "Circles in My Mind" for his then TV show, Flight 29 Down. Bleu signed a contract with Hollywood Records, a Disney-owned label. His debut album Another Side, was released in May 2007. The album debuted at No. 36 on the Billboard 200 album charts, selling 18,000 in its first week. Bleu, who admires Prince, Michael Jackson, and Justin Timberlake, cowrote five songs on the album. One of those tracks was titled "Shake It Off", an ode to the musician Prince. In 2007 he toured in support of Another Side with the teen sister duo Aly & AJ.

Bleu worked with Ne-Yo on "I Get Lonely", and with other performers such as Matthew Gerrard and Eric Hudson. A music video for his first single, "Push It to the Limit" premiered on the Disney Channel, and was used to promote the movie Jump In! "Push It to the Limit" reached the Top 20 on the Billboard Hot 100, and his second single, "Deal With It", was originally written and sung by Jay Sean. He later gave it to Bleu, whose version of the song features background vocals by Sean. The song went on to earn Sean a BMI Songwriter Award. Bleu sang the duet "Still There for Me" with Vanessa Hudgens for his debut album Another Side.

Bleu toured with fellow High School Musical cast members from late November 2006 to late January 2007 in High School Musical: The Concert, and with Drake Bell and Aly & AJ performing in about 40 different cities. To promote his debut album, Bleu performed at the Nextfest Summer Tour with the teen sister duo Aly & AJ and Drake Bell with Special Guest Bianca Ryan.

His debut single "Run It Back Again" was featured in the movie Minutemen, on January 22, 2008. The song is also featured on Radio Disney Jams, Vol. 10. Bleu performed at the Crawford County Fair Grandstand with Vanessa Hudgens, on August 18, 2008. A week later, on August 25, Bleu performed at the Michigan State Fair with Raven-Symoné.

His second album Speed of Light was released on March 10, 2009, via Hollywood Records. The album's first single, "Moments That Matter", was performed by Bleu at Kids' Inaugural: "We Are the Future". 

In 2017, Bleu signed a one-album recording contract with Ghostlight Records to distribute his Holiday Inn, The New Irving Berlin Musical soundtrack music, was released digitally on June 2, 2017. The album featured twenty-one songs, and was produced by Kurt Deutsch with Todd Whitelock serving as coproducer and Universal Stage Productions as executive producer.

Bleu released his a two-album recording contract with Ghostlight Records to distribute his Kiss Me, Kate soundtrack music, the 24th cast album recording for Roundabout Theatre Company, since launching the musical theatre program with She Loves Me in 1993.

Voice and musical ability
In an interview with Paul Wontorek, Bleu discussed that he is naturally a lyric baritone. As a musical theatre performer, Bleu claimed that he is a huge fan of Brian d'Arcy James and says that he gets vocal influences from him.

Personal life

Bleu has been a supporter of Do Something. On March 16, 2010, Bleu was added to the "Broadway Wall of Fame" as his portrait was unveiled at Tony's Di Napoli Restaurant in New York City.

In 2011, Bleu began dating actress Sasha Clements. On October 15, 2014, Bleu and Clements became engaged, and they married on July 23, 2016.

Philanthropy
Bleu has supported various charitable organizations and causes during his career.

In 2011, Bleu worked for charities such as Starlight Children's Foundation, the Make-A-Wish Foundation, and St. Jude Children's Research Hospital. In May 2011, Bleu also attended the Do Something Awards kick-off event.

Filmography

Movies

TV movies

Television

{| class="wikitable plainrowheaders sortable"
|-
!scope="col"| Title
!scope="col"| Year
!scope="col"| Role
!scope="col" class="unsortable" | Notes
|-
!scope=row| High Incident
| 1996
| N/A
| Recurring role
|-
!scope=row| ER
| 1996
| 
| 1 episode
|-
!scope=row| Malcolm & Eddie
| 1998
| Matthew
| Episode: "Menace II Theology"
|-
!scope=row| Cover Me: Based on the True Life of an FBI Family
| 2000
| 
| 1 episode
|-
!scope=row| The Amanda Show
| 2001–2002
| 
| 2 episodes
|-
!scope=row| Flight 29 Down
| 2005–2007
| 
| Main cast
|-
!scope=row| Ned's Declassified School Survival Guide
| 2006–2007
| Spencer
| 2 episodes
|-
!scope=row| Hannah Montana
| 2006–2008
| 
| 2 episodes
|-
!scope=row| Phineas and Ferb
| 2009
| 
| 2 episodes
|-
!scope=row| The Beautiful Life: TBL
| 2009
| 
| Main cast
|-
!scope=row| The Good Wife
| 2010
| 
| Episode: "Cleaning House"
|-
!scope=row| Blue Bloods
| 2012
| 
| 1 episode
|-
!scope=row| Franklin & Bash
| 2013
| 
| Episode: "Dead and Alive"
|-
!scope=row| One Life to Live
| 2013
| 
| Contract role
|-
!scope=row| Dancing with the Stars
| 2013–2017
| Himself
| Runner-Up (season 17)Participant in a trio Salsa in (season 25)
|-
!scope=row| Psych
| 2014
| 
| Episode: "Shawn and Gus Truck Things Up"
|-
!scope=row| Drop Dead Diva
| 2014
| 
| Episode: "Soulmates?"
|-
!scope=row| Fake Off
| 2015
| Host
| TV special
|-
!scope=row| High School Musical: 10th Anniversary
| 2016
| Himself
| Special
|-
!scope=row| Say Yes to the Dress
| 2016
| Himself
| Episode: "The Sasha Dress!"
|-
!scope=row| Castle
| 2016
| 
| Episode: "Tone Death"
|-
!scope=row| The Fosters
| 2016
| 
| Episode: "The Show"
|-
!scope=row| Battle of the Network Stars
| 2017
| Himself
| 1 episode
|-
!scope=row| The Middle
| 2018
| 
| Episode: "The Other Man"
|-
!scope=row| Chicago Med
| 2018
| 
| 1 episode
|-
!scope=row| Show Offs
| 2019
| Himself
| 1 episode
|-
!scope=row| The Disney Family Singalong
| 2020
| Himself
| Special
|-
!scope=row| Supergirl
| 2020
| 
| Episode: "Reality Bytes"
|-
!scope=row| Acting for a Cause
| 2020
| 
| Episode: "Up in the Air"
|-
!scope=row| Jimmy Awards
| 2021
| Host
| Special
|-
!scope=row| Dynasty
| 2021
| Blaine
| 2 episodes
|-
!scope=row| The Real Dirty Dancing
| 2022
| Himself
| Winner
|-
!scope=row| High School Musical: The Musical: The Series 
|2022
|Himself
|Recurring guest star
|-
!scope=row| Hell's Kitchen
| 2022
| Himself
| Chef's table guest diner for the Red Team; Episode: "Slipping Down to Hell"
|-
!scope="row" style="text-align:left; background:#ffc;"| Cars on the Road 
| 2022
| 
| Main cast
|-

|}

As a producer

Theatre

Video games

Music videos

Discography

Studio albumsAnother Side (2007)Speed of Light (2009)

Soundtrack albumsHigh School Musical (2006)Jump In! (2007)High School Musical 2 (2007)High School Musical 3: Senior Year (2008)Holiday Inn, The New Irving Berlin Musical (2017)Kiss Me, Kate (2019)

Concert tours
HeadliningHigh School Musical: The Concert (2006)

Opening actNextfest Summer Tour  (2007)Crawford County Fair Grandstand  (2008)Michigan State Fair  (2008)Kids' Inaugural: "We Are the Future"  (2009)Disney Channel Summer At Sea  (2009)

Awards and nominations

See also
 Jeffrey King
 List of characters from High School Musical
 List of Italian-American actors
 List of Italian-American entertainers
 List of Jamaican Americans

Notes

References

Further reading
 Dee Scott. Corbin Bleu: Up Close. 1230 Avenue of the Americas, New York, NY 10020: Pocket Books, 2006.  .
 West Betsy. Corbin Bleu to the Limit. Penguin young readers group, 345 Hudson Street, New York City 10014.: Penguin Group, 2007.  .
 Mary Boone''. Corbin Bleu. Mitchell Lane Publishers, P.O. Box 196 Hockessin, Delaware 19707.: Mitchell Lane, 2007/2008. .

External links

 
 
 
 
 

 
1989 births
Living people
20th-century American male actors
21st-century American male actors
21st-century American male singers
21st-century American singers
American actors of Jamaican descent
American dance musicians
American film producers
American male child actors
American male dancers
American male film actors
American male models
American male musical theatre actors
American male pop singers
American male singer-songwriters
American male soap opera actors
American male stage actors
American male television actors
American male voice actors
American musicians of Jamaican descent
American people of Italian descent
Dancers from New York (state)
Hollywood Records artists
Fiorello H. LaGuardia High School alumni
Los Angeles County High School for the Arts alumni
Male actors from New York City
Male models from New York (state)
Musicians from Brooklyn
Participants in American reality television series
Singers from New York City
Singer-songwriters from New York (state)
Walt Disney Records artists